Chenar-e Modvi-e Pain (also Romanized as Chenār-e Modvī-e Pā’īn; also known as Chenār-e Modvī) is a village in Kuhdasht-e Shomali Rural District, in the Central District of Kuhdasht County, Lorestan Province, Iran. At the 2006 census, its population was 100, in 17 families.

References 

Towns and villages in Kuhdasht County